The Laima Clock is a landmark in central Riga, Latvia. Its location between the Old Town and the Centre commercial district has made it a landmark of the city.

History 

The clock was completed in 1924 and initially was called the Big Clock (Lielais pulkstenis), but began to carry the name of the Laima confectionery company in 1936. During the Latvia SSR it was used as a political information stand. In 1999 the Laima Clock was fully reconstructed and its original design restored. On December 12, 2012, at 12:00 the clock rang for the first time since its installation.

Beginning from November 27, 2017, the clock was reconstructed again. The new style clock designed by Arvis Sproģis was unveiled on December 29, 2017. The reconstruction cost a toal of 106,000 euros and was covered by Orkla Group as a gift for 100th Anniversary of the Latvian Republic.

References

Buildings and structures completed in 1924
Buildings and structures in Riga
Time in Latvia
Individual clocks
Tourist attractions in Riga